Tre Manchester (born June 12, 1992) is an American real estate agent, film  writer, director, and producer known for his debut feature film The Things We've Seen.

Early life
Manchester was born in Springfield, Massachusetts, but grew up in Crown Point, Indiana. He attended Crown Point High School, and while there began to write fictional works. Within two years after he graduated, Manchester had published two books, including a novel War of Brothers a fictitious account of a family polarized by the American Civil War.

Film Career
Manchester formed his production company, Atlas Pictures, in the fall of 2013. Shortly after, he and his team began developing numerous short films, appearing in film festivals around the United States and the world.

His 2014 Holocaust drama film Your Ever After which formed his partnership with actor Jarrett Maier, went on to screen at the 2015 River Bend Film Festival, at that point located in South Bend, Indiana.

Following the successes of his short films, he went on to write his first feature-length screenplay for The Things We've Seen in September 2014. The following year he teamed up with producers Don Bernacky, John Metzler, and Roger Welp to begin filming in the summer in Crown Point, Indiana. A critical success, The Things We've Seen went on to play in twelve film festivals around the world, winning eight awards and securing four nominations. Represented by Crogan Filmworks, the movie went on to be picked up for distribution by Multicom Entertainment Group, Inc. for North American Television and Video-On-Demand distribution. It also gained the same platform release in China via Beijing Spark Future International Culture Communication Co., Ltd.

Real Estate Career
Tre is currently a real estate agent at Lively Charleston Properties with The Boulevard Company based in Charleston, South Carolina.

Filmography

Film

Series

Awards and accolades
 "Best Original Screenplay" – The Things We've Seen | Columbia Gorge International Film Festival
 "Best Feature" – The Things We've Seen | Mediterranean Film Festival
 "Outstanding Achievement Award" – The Things We've Seen | Calcutta International Cult Film Festival
 "Professional Narrative Feature" – The Things We've Seen | George Lindsey UNA Film Festival
 "Best Feature" – The Things We've Seen  | MayDay Film Festival
 "Best Actor" – The Things We've Seen  | MayDay Film Festival
 "Best Actress" – The Things We've Seen  | MayDay Film Festival
 "Gold Remi Award" – The Things We've Seen  | 50th Worldfest Houston International Film Festival
 "Audience Choice Award" – A Land Between | International Broke Student Film Festival
 "Audience Choice Award" – In Vermilion | Once A Week Online Film Festival

Nominations 
 "Best Picture" – The Things We've Seen  | Houston Critic's Choice Society
 "Best Actress" – The Things We've Seen  | Houston Critic's Choice Society
 "Best Supporting Actor" – The Things We've Seen  | Houston Critic's Choice Society
 "Best Young Performer" – The Things We've Seen  | Houston Critic's Choice Society
 "Top 200 Finalist" – Melancholic | HBO Project Greenlight (Presented by Matt Damon & Ben Affleck)
 "Runner-up" – In Vermilion | Yobi.TV Talent Competition

References

External links
 

Living people
Male actors from Indiana
People from Crown Point, Indiana
1992 births